No Limit Top Dogg is the fourth studio album and second on No Limit Records by American rapper Snoop Dogg. It was released May 11, 1999, by No Limit Records and Priority Records. Following the mixed reception of his previous two albums, Snoop began to work again with Dr. Dre and returned to the west coast sound of his earlier career while on Death Row Records. The album was generally met with positive reception with many critics citing it as a return to form and his best album since Doggystyle (1993). Many praised the production work for the album with the tracks made by Dr. Dre being highlighted as well as Snoop's delivery while criticism was mainly aimed at the length of the album, the No Limit features, and the lack of new lyrical content. The Source would later put the album on their list of the Top 10 Best Albums of the Year for 1999.

No Limit Top Dogg debuted at #2 on the Billboard 200, selling 187,000 copies in its first week alone in the United States, second only to Ricky Martin's self-titled album. This would be Snoop Dogg's first album to not debut at number-one and would ultimately end up being his lowest selling album of the 1990s. The album was certified platinum by the Recording Industry Association of America (RIAA). As of March 2008, the album has sold 1,518,000 copies in the United States and 2 million worldwide as of 2016.

Background 
Following the release of his previous album on No Limit, Snoop was granted more creative freedom by Master P which resulted in an album that returned to the sound of his early days on Death Row. Snoop Dogg explained "Master P signed me, so he had the right to dictate and direct me on the first album, because he was bringing me out as a No Limit soldier. To let me have creative control from the beginning wouldn't have been the smartest thing to do."

With this newfound freedom, Snoop sought out the help of former mentor and producer Dr. Dre. The album marks the first time they work together on record since Dre left Death Row. Regarding their relationship over the years, Snoop said "Behind the scenes, we've been basically helping each other out and critiquing each other's projects," He then added "We just went back to working with each other publicly ... the public wanted it, and we wanted it, and we're pushing for it and we're doing it." Attempts at reuniting date back to early 1998 when both collaborated on the song Zoom. However, contract problems emerged that prevented the release of said version (Snoop's verses were eventually replaced by east coast rapper LL Cool J and included in the soundtrack to the film Bulworth). Along with a slew of other former label mates and collaborators like Warren G, Nate Dogg, Jewell, DJ Quik, and Raphael Saadiq, Snoop himself viewed the album to be a companion piece to his debut album Doggystyle.

The album cover also marks a significant departure from the usual design style of all No Limit releases. In regards to this decision, Master P stated "When you look at that Snoop record, you know, you let Snoop be himself." He further stated "You look at his cover and it's got none of the bling and stuff that we always had, it's more about the dogs and what his image is about."

Music

Recording 
In comparison to his previous release Da Game Is to Be Sold, Not to Be Told which according to Snoop only took three weeks to make, work on this album spanned over many months beginning in 1998. The album also marks a departure from the southern sound of previous No Limit releases with only a few tracks featuring production and vocals from other No Limit artists and producers. Instead opting to work with more fellow west coast artists and producers in a "conscious effort" to return his brand of music that was present earlier in his career. Of the 19 songs on the album, three were produced by Dr. Dre. "It was matter of getting some shit from Dre that I didn't have, that would best represent him and would best represent me over his music," Snoop Dogg said. "He [directed] me on what to say and how to say it. I just chose the type of beats I wanted and the type of topics I wanted to rap about." In response to working again with Snoop and how times have changed since last working together, Dre stated the following:

Snoop also continues a previous tradition on his albums to include a cover of an older Hip-Hop song with the song "Snoopafella" (a remake of the song "Cinderfella Dana Dane" by New York rapper Dana Dane). Despite limited involvement on a musical level from No Limit, Snoop has stated that Master P has influenced the album in other ways with the track "I Love My Momma". Snoop mentions "If I wouldn't be on No Limit, I wouldn't even did a song like that, but since Master P, every album he do, he got a song about his momma. He got a song about his dead brother." Snoop also took influence again in his vocal performance from Dr. Dre himself during the process of making and recording songs. He further commented on the chemistry they both still had despite being separate for a while as well as how Dre once again took on a mentor role with him.

Production 
The overall production of the album has been noted to be heavily rooted in early '80s funk with a mixture of both West Coast and southern influences coming from his label at No Limit and his associates from his tenure at Death Row. In comparison to Da Game, only two tracks on the whole album are produced by No Limit's in-house production team Beats by the Pound. Dr. Dre's involvement was a major point of interest of the album for both fans and critics at the time of release with his influence being prevalent throughout. Despite his involvement, the album also branches out to newer styles of music that differs from ones found on The Chronic and Doggystyle. On tracks like "Buck 'Em", guitar elements were used that became present on other Dre productions of the time (like Eminem's "Role Model" from The Slim Shady LP) which hinted at what was to be featured on Dre's own 2001 album later that year. Other producers also make new contributions like the use of violins on the song "Trust Me", a rap ballad commenting about relationships. The album also ventures further into soul than previous releases with tracks like "Somethin' Bout Yo Bidness" and "I Love My Momma". Less apparent in the album's production is also the chiming keyboard loops found in Dre's earlier work that was highly popular at the time. The album is also a precursor to the West Coast Hip-Hop resurgence in popularity during that year.

Critical reception 

Top Dogg generally gained positive reviews with many critics citing it as a return to form after the mixed reception and different direction of the previous two albums released. Nathan Rabin of The A.V. Club noted "... Dogg sounds happier, looser, and more confident on Top Dogg than he has on any album since his Chronic/Doggystyle glory days." Later in the review he called it "... a vital album, and easily Snoop Dogg's best album since Doggystyle." The Washington Post highlighted the Dre-produced tracks "Just Dippin'" and "Buck 'Em" as one of the best Snoop-Dre collaborations. Source writer Frank Williams called it nearly flawless and said "By returning to his original 1993 flyness, Snoop meshes all his influences to create an album that will ride for a long time." The magazine later included the album on its "Top 10 Albums of the Year [1999]" list. Kevin Powell of Rolling Stone called the album "Snoop's finest work since his debut album...full of seductive party jams that will keep heads bobbing through the summer. Snoop has returned to West Coast G-funk with the help of some old friends...like Dr. Dre and DJ Quik." Neil Strauss of The New York Times positively compared the album to Snoop Dogg's previous release calling it a major musical improvement. NME mentioned "...the silken, sumptuous flow of yore is back, threading deluxe soul and full-bodied grooves....the cool drawl of Snoop...captivates, unveiling tales of love, thuggery, surviving and succeeding in the wild west....a certifiable return to form."

Despite the overall positive reception to the album it did receive some criticism from critics. The majority of it being aimed at the length of the whole project as well as the obligatory No Limit tracks. Stephen Thomas Erlewine of Allmusic said "...it runs way too long and is filled with superfluous, even irritating cameos, and also that Snoop is content to haul out low-rent gangsta clichés." He further comments on the lack of interesting and clever lyrics in comparison to his older material years ago. The A.V. Club also addresses the length being a problem with it being a few tracks too long. Criticism is also drawn to the tracks with features from other No Limit artists which writer Nathan Rabin considers to be the lowest points of the whole album. The Source's only criticism of the album is also aimed at the two No Limit tracks "Down 4 My Niggaz" and "Ghetto Symphony" calling them "overly-simplistic". Rolling Stone in particular criticized Snoop's lack of growth as a lyricist while declaring the whole album as not worthy of being compared to his debut.

In a retrospective list by Complex, the magazine placed No Limit Top Dogg at Number 17 on their list of "The Top 25 Best No Limit Albums" on April 5, 2013. This is the only album by Snoop Dogg on the label to be included on the list. Entertainment Weekly in 2015 ranked the album third overall as Snoop Dogg's best album only behind 2002's Paid Tha Cost To Be Da Bo$$ and 1993's Doggystyle respectively.

Commercial performance 
No Limit Top Dogg debuted at number-two and one on the US Billboard 200 and Top R&B/Hip-Hop Albums respectively, selling 187,400 copies in its first week. which was second only to Ricky Martin's 1999 self-titled album with huge first week sales of 661,000 copies. The following week the album sold an additional 108,000 copies dropping to number-seven until eventually bowing out of the top ten the following week. Although the release of the single 'Bitch Please' which gained popularity on both the radio and television helped album sales with a 16% rise on the Billboard 200 after months of declining on the charts. Despite not being as commercially successful as Still a G Thang from his previous album as it failed to chart within the Top 40 of the Billboard Hot 100 (peaking at 77), it still managed to peak at number-eight on the Billboard Hot Rap Singles on August 28 making it one of his highest ranking songs on that chart at the time. The music video also peaked at number-three on BET and charted within the top 20 most played videos on MTV. The video was directed by Dr. Dre.

Top Dogg eventually spent 40 weeks on the Billboard 200 which is second only to Doggystyle on weeks spent on the charts for a Snoop Dogg album. Despite being Snoop Dogg's first album to not debut at number-one and have strong first-week album sales, it was certified platinum on October 13, 1999 and sold 1,100,000 copies by the end of 1999 making it the 73rd best selling album of the year. Some speculated the reason for the relatively low turn out for the first week sales of the album is a result of the anticipation for Ricky Martin's album released the same week. The low awareness for the album was also thought to be due to a lack of a video or hit single prior to the release. As of March 2008, the album has sold 1,518,000 copies in the United States and 2 million worldwide as of 2016.

Track listing

Samples 
Buss'n Rocks
"Agony of Defeet" by Parliament
"Zoom" by Commodores
20 Minutes
"Row, Row, Row Your Boat" by Traditional Folk
Betta Days
"I Like Funky Music" by Uncle Louie
"Heartbeat" by Taana Gardner
Bitch Please
"Smooth Operator" by Sade
"Treat Her Like a Prostitute" by Slick Rick
Snoopafella
"Cinderfella Dana Dane" by Dana Dane
"Dazz" by Brick
Don't Tell
"Ain't No Fun (If the Homies Can't Have None)" by Snoop Dogg
Down 4 My N's
"Ike's Mood I" by Isaac Hayes
Ghetto Symphony
"The Symphony" by Marley Marl
In Love With a Thug
"Moments in Love" by Art of Noise
My Heat Goes Boom
"Only in California" by Mack 10
Party With a D.P.G.
"Shining Star" by Earth, Wind & Fire

Charts

Weekly charts

Year-end charts

Certifications

See also
 List of number-one R&B albums of 1999 (U.S.)

References

External links 
 Music Video Database
 Rap Sample FAQ
 "SamplingLaw.com"

Snoop Dogg albums
1999 albums
Albums produced by Ant Banks
Albums produced by Bud'da
Albums produced by Dr. Dre
Albums produced by DJ Quik
Albums produced by G-One
Albums produced by Raphael Saadiq
No Limit Records albums
Priority Records albums
Gangsta rap albums by American artists